István Gulyás (born 2 April 1968) is a Hungarian handball coach and former handball player and coach of the Hungarian national handball team.

Gulyás spent most of his playing career by Veszprém, the dominant club of his era, with them he won a number of domestic league and cup titles. Among his successes is an EHF Cup Winners' Cup triumph as well, having obtained the title in 1992. In 1995 he was honoured with the Hungarian Handballer of the Year award for his performances throughout the year.

In his later years in tried himself in Austria by HSG Bärnbach-Köflach and finished his career by Hungarian lower division side Rinyamenti KC. UHK Krems, which remembered Gulyás since the years he spent in Austria, appointed him as their head coach in 2006. Gulyás had one season on the bench of Krems, achieving a fifth place in the league. In 2007 he got invited by his friend and former Hungarian international handballer Sándor Kaló to Kuwait to train a local club, which Gulyás accepted, and from 2007 to 2011 he trained Khaitan SC.

Gulyás returned to Hungary in 2011, and in August that year he was named the head coach of Dunaújvárosi NKS.

Achievements
Nemzeti Bajnokság I:
Winner: 1992, 1993, 1994, 1995, 1997, 1998, 1999
Magyar Kupa:
Winner: 1989, 1990, 1991, 1992, 1994, 1995, 1996, 1998, 1999
EHF Cup Winners' Cup:
Winner: 1992
Finalist: 1993, 1997

Awards
 Hungarian Handballer of the Year: 1995

References

 Kozák, Péter (1994). Ki kicsoda a magyar sportéletben?, vol. I. (A–H). Szekszárd: Babits Kiadó. .

External links

1968 births
Living people
Hungarian male handball players
Hungarian handball coaches
Expatriate handball players
Hungarian expatriate sportspeople in Austria
Hungarian expatriate sportspeople in Kuwait
Handball coaches of international teams